This is a list of singles which topped the Irish Singles Chart in 1967.

Prior to 1992, the Irish singles chart was compiled from trade shipments from the labels to record stores, rather than on consumer sales. Note that the chart release day changed from Monday to Saturday during March, and to Thursday in May (Note how this meant The Dubliners technically had less than one week at the top of a weekly chart). The release date moved back to Saturday in November.

See also
1967 in music
Irish Singles Chart
List of artists who reached number one in Ireland

1967 in Irish music
1967 record charts
1967